Patelloida conulus is a species of sea snail, a true limpet, a marine gastropod mollusk in the family Lottiidae, one of the families of true limpets.

Description
Length of shell is

Distribution
Distributed in East Asia region, from the northeast at South Korea, down to the Taiwan and Kinmen (Quemoy) around the Taiwan Strait and also in Hong Kong.

The shell lives in intertidal area, sometimes attached to sand basal or on top of rocks or shells inside calm sea bay.

References

External links

Lottiidae
Gastropods described in 1861